Victor Gustave Lefèvre (2 June 1831 in Provins – 17 March 1910 in his home in Boulogne-Billancourt) was a French composer and music educator.

Publications 

 Traité de contrepoint et du rythme (unpublished),
 Traité d'harmonie (1889). In 1900 he founded La Nouvelle Maîtrise, a revival of the magazine formerly founded by Louis Niedermeyer.
 Writing of the article about the Niedermeyer School of Classical Music for l'encyclopédie de la musique and the Dictionnaire du Conservatoire, by Albert Lavignac and Lionel de La Laurencie.

Bibliography 
 Dictionnaire de la musique en France au XIXe under the guidance of Joël-Marie Fauquet (Fayard)
 L'École Niedermeyer, sa création, son but, son développement by Maurice Galerne (Éditions Margueritat)
 Dictionnaire national des contemporains Tome II, by C.E. Curinier, Paris (Office général d'édition)
 Dossier Niedermeyer Rés. Dos 19, BNF
 Documents légués à la ville de Provins Fonds ancien de la Ville de Provins

References

External links
 

1831 births
1910 deaths
People from Provins
French Romantic composers
19th-century French musicians
French music educators